Code Blue is a 2011 Dutch drama film written and  directed by Urszula Antoniak and starring Bien de Moo der. It premiered in the Directors' Fortnight section at the 2011 Cannes Film Festival.

Cast 

Bien de Moor as Marian 
 Lars Eidinger as Konrad 
 Annemarie Prins as Willie 
 Sophie van Winden as Anne 
 Christine Bijvanck as Night nurse 
 Hans Kesting as Doctor

References

External links

 
Dutch drama films
2011 drama films
2011 films